Robert Coe (26 October 1596 – 1689) was an early English settler and the progenitor in New England of many Coes in America. Robert Coe was born at Thorpe Morieux, Suffolk, England, and baptised there on October 26, 1596, as recorded in parish registers. His father, Henry Coe, had been a yeoman, probably a clothmaker, and for several years was church warden.

In 1625 Robert Coe is shown as living in Boxford, Suffolk, then a thriving rural and manufacturing parish eight miles south of Thorpe Morieux, where he lived until leaving for America in 1634. Robert Coe and his family took passage from Ipswich aboard the Francis, commanded by Capt. John Cutting.

Experience in the Colonies
Once in New England, Coe and his family located for a brief time in Watertown, Massachusetts, where several other Puritan families from Boxford had located.

In June 1635 Robert Coe joined a few others in starting a new plantation at Wethersfield, Connecticut, in the fertile Connecticut River Valley. He lived there for about five years where his house was situated at what is now the northwest corner of East Main and Broad Streets. A division within the church caused Robert Coe and his adherents to purchase lands for a new plantation at Stamford, Connecticut.

While in Stamford he rose to become a magistrate on 5 April 1643, and to serve as a deputy to the General Court at New Haven the same year and also in 1644. Once again a dispute within the church caused Robert Coe and the Rev. Richard Denton to cross the Long Island Sound in 1644 to Long Island, then under Dutch rule. There Coe helped to establish a new settlement called Hempstead. A church was established, with Robert Coe chosen as the elder. He remained there for eight years, acquired extensive land, and was magistrate of the town under the Dutch government.

Eventually Coe helped to form another new settlement, a few miles west on Long Island at a place known as Mespat, which had been previously settled in 1642 but destroyed in an Indian attack the following year. A new church was formed with Rev. John Moore as the pastor and Robert Coe the elder. The settlement took on the name of Middleburg and Hastings before being permanently named Newtown. Mr. Coe remained there for four years, being the most prominent man and local magistrate his whole time there. In 1653 he went to Boston as a deputy of the town to ask for protection from the Massachusetts Bay Colony against Indians, who were threatening attack. In November of the same year he was sent as deputy to New Amsterdam to confer with the Dutch on the same issue.

From Middleburg, Robert Coe, his youngest son Benjamin Coe, and several others purchased a large tract of land south of Newtown, today Jamaica, Queens, and settled there. The Dutch appointed Robert Coe magistrate for Jamaica in 1658, an office which he held until 1664. When the English population on Long Island revolted from the Dutch at New Amsterdam and transferred their allegiance to Connecticut, Coe went along as well serving as deputy for Jamaica to the General Court at Hartford by which he was appointed commissioner (or magistrate) for Jamaica. He last served as high-sheriff of Yorkshire after governance of this portion of Long Island fell under the jurisdiction of New York.

Near the end of his life, Robert Coe settled his estate among his three sons. He married a third wife, Jane Rouse, when over 80 years of age. He bought a farm of fifty acres at Foster's Meadow in Hempstead on 29 November 1678, where he lived until his death. His home on Long Island stood until 1930 when it was demolished to accommodate the construction of LaGuardia Airport.

Famous descendants
 Henry Waldo Coe, an early doctor in The Dakotas, an influential person in Portland, Oregon, business and politics and a friend of Theodore Roosevelt
 British Prime Minister Sir Winston Churchill
 Country music singer David Allan Coe
 U.S. President George W. Bush
 Barbara Bush is the great-granddaughter of Daniel and Mary Coe's daughter Sarah. In 1855 Sarah Coe married John W. Robinson, a Marysville area farmer.
 Barbara's grandfather, Judge James E. Robinson of Union County, served on the Ohio Supreme Court.
 Vern Centennial Gorst, "Grandad of United Airlines".

Footnotes

1596 births
1689 deaths
People of colonial Connecticut
Kingdom of England emigrants to Massachusetts Bay Colony
People of the Province of New York
Deputies of the Connecticut General Court (1639–1662)
Magistrates of the Connecticut General Court (1636–1662)